The Ronchamp Coal Mines  were an area of coal mines located in the Vosges and Jura coal mining basins, in eastern France. They covered three municipalities; Ronchamp, Champagney and Magny-Danigon. Operated for more than two centuries, from the mid-eighteenth century until the mid-twentieth century, they have profoundly changed the landscape, the economy and the local population.

Mining began in Ronchamp in the mid-18th century and had developed into a large industry by the late 19th century, employing 1500 people.
 
Extraction started in adit before being dug at coal mine Saint Louis in 1810, introducing the first real extraction mine-shaft. The shaft seams sunk more and more, and became deeper until the well, owned by (Civil Society coal Ronchamp), eventually became the deepest mine in France beating the coal mine du Magny (694 meters) in 1878 and the coal mine Arthur de Buyer (1010 meters) in 1900. After the nationalisation of mines in 1946, the shaft and the thermal power station was entrusted to Electricité de France.

After closing in 1958, the mining sites and infrastructures were demolished and workers had to convert to other professions. Later, a museum and two associations were created to preserve the memory of the mining heritage and several sites were redeveloped to become tourist attractions.

The museum looks back at the miner's work, their techniques, tools they used and their social life. A collection of miners lamps are also on display.

Geography

Situation 

The zone exploited and influenced by the coal mines corresponds to the Ronchamp and Champagney mining basin which is at the heart of the Vosges and Jura coal mining basins, on the eastern part of the French department of the Haute-Saône, in the northern part of the French region of Bourgogne-Franche-Comté, close to Alsace and the industries of Mulhouse. The coal mines are then an essential source of energy for both regions.  The Alsatian catchment area is between the towns of Mulhouse, Thann et Cernay.

The concession of Ronchamp, Champagney and Éboulet, where the mines are exploited, has 4503 hectares and includes the communes of Ronchamp, Champagney, Magny-Danigon, Clairegoutte, Andornay, Palante and La Côte (only the first three have coal mines). It is surrounded by the Mourière concession to the northwest, the Saint-Germain concession to the west and the Lomont concession to the south but also by other exploratory mines to the east.

Mine list

Picture

References

See also

Connected Articles 
 Notre-Dame Mine Shaft
 Arthur de Buyer Coal Mine
 Sainte Marie Coal Mine

External links 

  Les amis du musée de la mine.
 English website about the Coal mine of Ronchamp

Coal mines in France
History articles needing translation from French Wikipedia
Science articles needing translation from French Wikipedia